Abd Manaf al-Mughirah ibn Qusai (ʿAbd Manāf al-Mughīrah ibn Quṣayy) was a Qurayshi and great-great-grandfather of the Islamic prophet Muhammad. His father was Quṣai ibn Kilāb.

Biography
Abd Manaf was already honoured in his father's lifetime however Qusai preferred his first-born 'Abd ad-Dar and invested him with all his rights, powers, and transferred the ownership of the House of Assembly shortly before his death.

Father's death 
After Quṣayy's death, Abd Manaf contested this inheritance. He was supported by their nephew Asad, their uncle Zuhrah ibn Kilab, their father's uncle Taym ibn Murrah (of Banu Taym), and al-Harith ibn Fihr, while 'Abd ad-Dar was supported by their cousins Makhzum, Sahm, Jumah, their uncle Adi and their families. The effects of this conflict continued among their descendants, especially under Abd Manaf's son Hashim and affected the internal history of Mecca right up to Muhammad's time.

Family
Abdu Manaf married several wives of influential tribes, including 'Ātikah bint Murrah ibn Hilāl ibn Fālij ibn Dhakwān ibn Hilal ibn Sa'sa'ah ibn Mu'awiyah ibn Bakr ibn Hawazin al-Hilaliyya of Bani Qays Aylan, Hilal of the Banu Bakr ibn Hawāzin, Raytah of Ta'if, and Waqida bint Amr.

Origin of tribes of Quraysh 
Abd Manaf had three wives: 

1. Atikah bint Murrah al-Hulaliyya 
 a. Muttalib ibn Abd Manaf, Founder/ancestor of Banu Muttalib
 b. Amr-al-Ula/Hashim ibn Abd Manaf, Founder/ancestor of Banu Hashim
 c. Abd Shams/Qays-al-Ula ibn Abd Manaf, Founder/ancestor of Banu Abd Shams
 d. Tumadir bint Abd Manaf al-Quraishiyya
 e. Qilabah bint Abd Manaf al-Quraishiyya
 f. Hayyah bint Abd Manaf al-Quraishiyya
 g. Rayta bint Abd Manaf al-Quraishiyya
 h. Khathma bint Abd Manaf al-Quraishiyya
 i. Sufyanah bint Abd Manaf al-Quraishiyya

2. Rayta bint Ku'ayb al-Thaqafiyya 
 a. Abd ibn Abd Manaf
 b. Abd-al-Amr ibn Abd Manaf

3. Waqidah bint Amr al-Qurayshiyya al-Amiriyya 
 Nawfal ibn Abd Manaf, Founder/ancestor of Banu Nawfal

Death and burial 
The grave of Abd Manaf can be found in Jannatul Mualla cemetery, in Mecca.

Notable descendants

See also
Abd Manaf (name)
Family tree of Muhammad
List of notable Hijazis

References

External links
al-islam.org

430 births
Year of death missing
5th-century Arabs
Ancient Arabs
Ancestors of Muhammad
Sahabah ancestors
Burials at Jannat al-Mu'alla
Quraysh